The Emirate of Mascara, Emirate of Abd al-Qadir, or the Resistance of Mascara, was founded by Abd al-Qadir al-Jazairi with the allegiance of the people of Algeria to resist the French conquest of Algeria with its first capital at Mascara then Tagdemt after it was taken by France.

Government 
The system of government was simple and analogous to the regime of the deys of the Deylik of Algiers. However, it profoundly revised the doctrine of power to a more egalitarian basis. The emir was head of the state, and governed with his divan or council of ministers. He was assisted by a majlis, an advisory council of wise personalities, ulamas and khalifas representing the provinces and presided over by a qāḍī al-quḍāt or chief justice.

Algeria was divided by the emir into eight khalifalik, themselves subdivided into aghalik, which grouped several qaidat. This division took into account local influences and history, especially on the tribal level.

Economic policy 
The emir very early attached importance to structuring an economy, perceived as necessary for the perpetuation of his state. He set up a number of factories and industries in Tagdemt, his new capital. Local production of the necessary goods, especially the war effort, was accorded great importance. The cities of Tlemcen, Mascara, Miliana, Medea and Tagdemt made the necessary powder. Tagdemt and Miliana had foundries and weapon factories. He also wished to regulate the souqs with greater surveillance and security of the sites and trade routes to promote trade. Agriculture was encouraged, with the suppression of the kharaj to encourage the fellahs and the utilization of periods of truce. Finally, the emir set up a currency struck at Tagdempt to ensure the financial autonomy of the state in 1834 to 1841.

Military structure 

The emir realized that the power of the state is reflected by its military strength; it also aids in giving the state a prestigious image internationally. The Emir used the military to enforce order and security and to stop the chaos that spread after the fall of Turkish rule in Algeria.

Social organization in Algeria was mainly tribal then, with individuals only attached to their tribes; nationalism was unknown at the time. In war or conflict the tribes gathered together with their men and cavalry then went to war. Afterwards the men returned to their tribes and continued with their daily work; military service was not enforced with the tribes. The regular army of the emir was formed of volunteers. Recruitment was open to young people from all regions and all tribes, and called for jihad against the French invaders. Recruitment had no requirements and was for all ages and in all regions of the Emirate. The emir organized an army to protect the Emirate because he knew that he would confront French armies that were better-trained and better-equipped, commanded by experienced officers and generals. The emir was the first leader to establish a national army in the modern history of Algeria.

He also built factories to manufacture weapons using the experience of the French, Spaniards and Italians.

He called his army Jaish Al-Mohammadi (Mohammad's Army), divided into three divisions: infantry, cavalry and artillery. Then he developed military law regarding discipline, recruitment, policies, salaries and weapons. The Jaish Al-Mohammadi was formed of 8,000 soldiers, 2,000 cavalry, 2,240 light cannons and 20 heavy cannons.

Khayala (Cavalry): soldiers who fought on horseback
Moushat (Infantry): soldiers fighting on foot
Tobajiya (Artillery): soldiers with cannons. The artillery unit soldiers of the Jaish Al-Mohammadi were deserters from the French army, Turks and Kouloughlis. They were experienced in maintaining light and heavy cannons. Each artillery unit had twelve soldiers.
Irregular: 10,240
Regular: 5,960

Uniform 
Emir Abdelkader classed a unique uniform for each type of soldier, the cloth was linen and gasket. It consisted of a jacket of grey wool including a hood and trousers also made from wool are in blue also Sedria (vest) are in red. Every three months a soldier was given a shirt and a pair of shoes, yellow leather including a burnous (long cloak made from wool).

The cavalry uniform consisted of a red jacket with black stripes on the sleeve seams and back, also a red vest decorated with blue hair on it. Each cavalryman was issued a haik which covered the head and shoulders, made from camel's hair including a turban.

Motto 
" لَا شَيْء أَكْثَرُ فَائِدَة مِنْ التَّقْوَى وَالشَّجَاعَةَ " (“Nothing is more beneficial than piety and courage”)

Weapons 
Each soldier had a leather bag which could be worn on a belt over the right shoulder, also a rifle with a bayonet, pistols and a yatagan (curved blade) attached to his belt. The cavalrymen were armed with a rifle, yatagan and pistol.

Food 
As food, each soldier received two  (Algerian bread) and a kilogram of flour and semolina to cook couscous twice a week. Each group of 20 men shared a sheep between them.

Wages 
The wage of a soldier was paid from April to June monthly depending on rank:
 Agha (General) 22 Budjus
 Sayaf (First Lieutenant) 12 Budjus
 Rais Sayaf (Lieutenant) 8 Budjus
 Jaouche (Corporal) 7 Budjus
 Khaba (Captain) 6 Budjus

Budju: a currency used by the Turks in Algeria
1 Boudjou = 50 Mohammadia

Housing 
In the garrison, soldiers often lived in rooms that had mats and carpets. In camp, about 20 soldiers lived in a war tent.

Rankings 
Each badge of embroidered sword on attached on each shoulder of the following soldiers including silver rings on their left hand.

 Agha (General) 4 Gold Badges
 Sayaf (First Lieutenant) 2 Gold Badges
 Rais Sayaf (Lieutenant) 2 Silver Badges
 Jaouche (Corporal) 1 Silver Badge
 Khaba (Captain) 1 Bronze Badge

Command units 
 Emir's Bodyguards – 500 men – commanded by Emir Abdelkader
  (Battalion) – 1000 men – commanded by Agha
 Sariya (Company) – 100 men – commanded by Sayaf
 Fasela (Platoon) – 35 men – commanded by Khaba

He also sought to import weapons from the only country that opposed the French invasion of Algeria, England, but failed. The Emir endeavoured to build an arsenal of ammunition and weapons, both in Mascara and Takdempt with the assistance from foreign expertise so the Emir hired men with industrial experience in making weapons like the Spaniards, Italians and also French, the Emir also chose the best fully fortified strategic locations like the city of Miliana and built an arms factory in its suburbs so that he could manufacture ammunition and weapons.

The emir's factory started to manufacture Algerian weapons. The Algerian Army used weapons captured by the Emir's army from the French. Emir Abdelkader trained his army well and employed special military combat and tactics, he also exploited the terrains he and his troops were familiar to like mountains and fields. The Emir extensively adopted guerrilla warfare against the invading forces, often resorting to ambushes.

Provinces of the Emirate 
Abdelkader divided his emirate into administrative provinces to facilitate management and ease the burden on the central government.

Each province was divided into districts which were further divided into groups of tribes. The head of a district was called Agha and the Sheikh was the head of a group of tribes.

Flag and emblem

Flag 
Emir Abdelkader Al-Jazairi designed a banner with green silk bars above and below a center of white silk. A hand drawn on the white center was surrounded by golden words "victory from Allah and the reconquest is near, and the victory by Emir Abdelkader"

Emblem 
The emblem of the state was a hexagram, with writings around its circumference: Allah, Mohammed, Abu Bakr, Omar, Othman and Ali. In the middle of the star Nasir Al-Din Emir Adbelkader Ben Muhieddine is written.

Administration

Education 
Education was a primary concern of the Emir. He believed that developing in this field is to take care of books and references whatever the value of it scientific, literary. Therefore, the Emir attempted his best to collect books on different subjects by buying, copying or transporting them.

The Emir also issued strict orders to his soldiers not to mishandle or disrespect books, and breaking these orders was severely punished. He also used to reward them for bringing a book or the author. To copy one manuscript would take several months and this was a long time for the Emir because of the war with the French colonisers.

This policy had great success in bringing books from different fields to his emirate, the Emir also build a library to store and organize these books that he had gathered but he also linked the library with many organizations in the emirate like schools, masjids and zāwiyas (religious schools), the library was open to everyone:students, scholars and even soldiers. He also used to store a huge number of manuscripts in Takdemt Fortress, where he used to keep not only manuscripts but also classified state documents and diplomatic letters.

The emir took care of books and manuscripts even in war; he transported all the books and manuscripts that had been stored in Takdemt fortress to his personal encampment ( zmālah, romanised as "the Smala") after the fortress fell to French invaders, nevertheless, French soldiers seized the books and manuscripts after the Battle of the Smala in 1843. The Emir chose qualified teachers to improve the education in the emirate, he supported the teachers financially and morally and paid them wages depending on their qualifications as he also built schools across his emirate in villages, towns and cities.

During the fall of the emirate, its manuscripts were looted by the French and brought to the Château de Chantilly, although some were lost. The first full catalogue of the 39 surviving manuscripts was published in 2022; the authors observe that the texts have historical value and have never been completely analyzed.

Judicial system 
After establishing the emirate and its administrative divisions, the emir appointed to each region a qadi to rule in accordance with the Maliki school of fiqh. Justice is the basis of governance, so he set requirements for judges: to be honest, just, chaste and practise Islam.

To ensure that the judiciary ran well, the Emir paid each judge a respectable monthly wage of 100 douro (50 francs) and additional payments based on the type of case he judged. The Emir separated the civil and military judiciary, then appointed for each department a special judge to decide the issues and cases. The judge could be elected only for a single year.

The emir also recruited two clerics to each regional councils. The senior cleric studied fatwas (legal judgments) issued by the judge of a particular region then sent them to Mascara for deeper study. The Emir linked all the judges in the regions to review their cases with the Qāḍī al-Quḍāt Ahmed ben Al-Hashemi Al-Mrahi.

The Emir also wanted the provisions of the civil and military judiciary to come under sharia, which the Emir made the source for rule in the Emirate. Its provisions derive from the Quran, Sunnah, and ijtihad, and reminded the people of the days of the Rashidun Caliphate. He considered the success of the new established Emirate to have been removing the corruption inherited from the Turks, working to change the old relations and unifying the Algerian people. This policy united the Algerians, helping him to later face the French invasion.

Immediately and especially if there was a threat against the homeland such as an enemy, response to threats intended to deter others, with no appeal. “He who helps the enemy financially will be financially punished (fines) and the one who helps the enemy physically will be punished by decapitation (executions),” he said.

And so in justice and security, people lived peacefully under the flag of a popular national emirate, crime vanished and calm returned after the chaos that had followed the fall of Turkish rule in Algeria. The emir also fought ethical corruption in society, banning prostitution, drinking alcohol and drugs across his emirate, and also banned soldiers from playing cards and wearing gold and silver except in their weapons and horses, ordering them to pray at the mosque.

The Emir said “Know that the only purpose of my acceptance of this position (Emir) only that you will be safe on yourselves and your honour and your wealth assured on your country enjoying your religious duties and I cannot reach that except with your help by money or men.”

See also
 French conquest of Algeria
 Reghaïa attack (1837)
 Expedition of the Col des Beni Aïcha (1837)
 First Battle of Boudouaou (1837)
 History of Algeria
 Ottoman Algeria
 Algerian War

Bibliography
 Emirate of Abdelkader, Military Structure
 Abd el-Kader, chef de guerre (1832-1847), par Jacques Frémeaux, dans: Revue historique des armées, n.250 (2008), pp. 100–107 1
 Algérie: le passé, l'Algérie française, la révolution, 1954-1958, par Jacques Simon - Éditions L'Harmattan, 2007 Analyse de l’État d'Abd el Kader pp. 45-48
 Abd el Kader, sa vie politique et militaire, par Alexandre Bellemare Hachette 1863 Organisation de son État, par Abd el Kader lui-même pp. 221-241
 Histoire d'el Hadj Abd el Kader (1848), par El Hossin ben Ali ben Ali Taleb cousin de l'émir, dans - Revue Africaine - 1876 pp. 419–455 (Récit autobiographique par un cavalier d'Abd el Kader, 1832 à 1844)
 Organisation du territoire d'Abd-el-Kader (read online (french))
 L'État d'Abd-el-Kader et sa puissance en 1841, d'après le rapport du sous-intendant militaire Massot (read online (french))
 مقاومة الأمير عبد القادر  1832-1847
 بيعة الأمير عبد القادر
 الجزائريون يتذكّرون مبايعة الأمير عبد القادر

Notes and references 

19th century in Algeria
Mascara Province
1832 establishments in Africa
1847 disestablishments in Africa
States and territories established in 1832
States and territories disestablished in 1847
North African culture
Colonialism
Algeria articles needing expert attention
Algerian War
Religious leaders in Africa
Algerian rebels
Algerian history timelines
Invasions by France
Resistance movements
Military history of Algeria